Ayser Al-Hyari (born 1 January 1959) is a Jordanian sport shooter. He competed in the 1984 Summer Olympics.

References

1959 births
Living people
Shooters at the 1984 Summer Olympics
Jordanian male sport shooters
Olympic shooters of Jordan
Shooters at the 1998 Asian Games
Asian Games competitors for Jordan
20th-century Jordanian people